Infant Jesus Matriculation Higher Secondary School also known as IJMHSS is located in Palladam near Coimbatore. It has classes from LKG to +2.

Infrastructure
 Physics lab
 Chemistry lab
 Biology lab
 Computer lab
 Library
 Smart Class

External links
 Official Website

References

Private schools in Tamil Nadu
Christian schools in Tamil Nadu
Primary schools in Tamil Nadu
High schools and secondary schools in Tamil Nadu
Schools in Coimbatore
Educational institutions established in 1993
1993 establishments in Tamil Nadu